Samuel Alan "Slammin Sammy" Swindell (born October 26, 1955) is an American sprint car driver. He is a three-time champion and four-time runner-up in the World of Outlaws series; he has also competed in NASCAR and Champ Car competition and attempted to qualify for the 1987 Indianapolis 500.

Career

Swindell is a three-time World of Outlaws champion. He won his first two titles in 1981 and 1982 driving the famous Nance Speed Equipment #1n house car. He won his third title  in 1997 driving his own Channel Lock sponsored No. 1 team car. Sammy has 394 World of Outlaws A-main victories to his credit. He also competed in the CART series in 1985 and 1986 and failed to qualify for the 1987 Indianapolis 500 in a March-Pontiac. Swindell took off the wings in 1981, to win the prestigious Pacific Coast Nationals at Ascot.

Swindell made his debut in the NASCAR Winston Cup Series in the 1985 Atlanta Journal 500; in 1991, he planned to move full-time to the Winston Cup Series, competing for Rookie of the Year for Moroso Racing, but he was fired by the team following several spins during Speedweeks and crashing again in qualifying for the second race of the year at Richmond International Raceway. Following his release he returned to sprint car racing.

Swindell ran a limited schedule in the NASCAR Busch Series in 1993; the team closed mid-season, and he returned to sprint car racing once more. Swindell also competed in a full season of the NASCAR Craftsman Truck Series in 1995, driving for Akins-Sutton Motorsports; he finished 12th in points, scoring five top-ten finishes in the series' inaugural season.

2007 was his 35th consecutive year as a race car driver, racing beside his 18-year-old son Kevin.  He's a five-time winner of the prestigious Chili Bowl Midget Nationals, the only driver to win it more than three times, until his son Kevin won his fourth straight race in 2013. During the 2008 season he raced in northern California winning a main event in the California Civil War Series in Placerville and also at the famed Silver Dollar Speedway in Chico, California. Swindell is considered one of the best driver/setup men in the business. He is known for experimenting with innovative technology.

His father Sam, was a successful driver and his brother Jeff, is still an active and successful sprint car driver.

On August 25, 2014, Swindell announced he was retiring from racing, though he intends to race in the Chili Bowl Nationals.

In 2015 Swindell made short work of retirement and signed with Chad and Jenn Clemens owners of CJB Motorsports out of Telford, PA. Sammy ran a partial schedule and will do the same in 2016. Sam stated he has no intention of running a full schedule anymore, but picks and chooses the races he wants to run. This benefits the team with testing and keeps him active in the sport he loves. As of September 2020, he has 394 World of Outlaws Sprint Car wins.

Motorsports career results

World of Outlaws
1978: 9th in points – 2 wins
1979: 2nd in points – 11 wins
1980: 5th in points – 10 wins
1981: Champion – 28 wins
1982: Champion – 14 wins
1983: 3rd in points – 17 wins
1984: 2nd in points – 13 wins
1985: 7th in points – 14 wins
1986: 11th in points – 12 wins
1987: 12th in points – 6 wins
1988: 2nd in points – 8 wins
1990: 10th in points – 14 wins
1991: 9th in points – 15 wins
1992: 11th in points – 20 wins
1994: 5th in points – 7 wins
1995: 12th in points – 5 wins
1996: 3rd in points – 11 wins
1997: Champion – 19 wins
1998: 3rd in points – 7 wins
1999: 5th in points – 8 wins
2000: 2nd in points – 11 wins
2001: 18th in points – 2 wins
2002: 17th in points –  1 win
2003: 11th in points – 1 win
2004: 18th in points – 3 wins
2005: 19th in points – 3 wins
2006
2007
2008
2009: 13th in points – 0 wins
2010: 16th in points –  4 wins
2011: 12th in points – 4 wins
2012: 3rd in points – 13 wins
2013: 6th in points – 3 wins
2014: 14th in points – 2 wins
2015: 16th in points – 0 wins
2016
2017
2018: 57th in points – 0 wins

NASCAR
(key) (Bold – Pole position awarded by qualifying time. Italics – Pole position earned by points standings or practice time. * – Most laps led.)

Winston Cup Series

Daytona 500

Busch Series

SuperTruck Series

Trans-Am Championship

References

External links

Living people
1955 births
People from Bartlett, Tennessee
Racing drivers from Tennessee
World of Outlaws drivers
NASCAR drivers
Champ Car drivers
Indy Lights drivers
American Speed Association drivers
Trans-Am Series drivers
People from Germantown, Tennessee
USAC Silver Crown Series drivers
A. J. Foyt Enterprises drivers
Rocketsports Racing drivers